Konstam is a surname. Notable people with the surname include:

Angus Konstam (born 1960), Scottish author and historian
Anna Konstam (1914–1982), British theatre and film actress
Kenneth Konstam (1906–1968), English bridge player
Phyllis Konstam (1907–1976), English film actress